Kingswinford is a town of the Metropolitan Borough of Dudley in the English West Midlands, situated  west-southwest of central Dudley. In 2011 the area had a population of 25,191, down from 25,808 at the 2001 Census.

The current economic focus of Kingswinford is education and housing for commuters. Positioned at the far western edge of the West Midlands Urban Area it borders on a rural area extending past the River Severn; but its position at the edge of the Black Country and its long standing in the area means it has had significant industrial influence in the past. This is illustrated by the influence in creating local workhouses, which shows a population of 15,000 plus in the 1831 census.

History
Historically in Staffordshire, Kingswinford is mentioned in the Domesday Book; its name relates to a ford for the King's swine (Kingswin(e)ford) – Latin Swinford Regis. The ancient parish of Kingswinford spanned Wordsley, Brierley Hill and Quarry Bank. The parishes of Kingswinford and Amblecote formed the Kingswinford rural district in 1894, and gave its name to the Kingswinford Parliament constituency from 1885 until 1950. However, Amblecote became its own urban district in 1898, leaving Kingswinford one of a minority of single-parish rural districts in England. It was added to the Brierley Hill urban district in 1935, which became part of the County Borough of Dudley in 1966, now the Metropolitan Borough of Dudley. However, the rural part of the parish was added to Kinver in 1935, becoming part of Seisdon district in 1966 and since 1974 part of South Staffordshire.

Recent house building, commencing in the 1950s and 1960s, has largely destroyed the original rural character of Kingswinford, the result being the complete absorption of the former village into the adjoining urban area.

Until its closure in 2012, Kingswinford was home to food retailer Julian Graves' head office and distribution centre.

Geography
Kingswinford is a part of the West Midlands metropolitan county, West Midlands conurbation, and the Metropolitan Borough of Dudley. It is situated on the extreme western edge of the conurbation, and to the north, east and south lie other suburban areas of the Black Country. However, the border to the west is green belt, which stretches for many miles through Staffordshire, Shropshire, beyond the Severn Valley and into Wales.

The Kingswinford DY6 postal district covers the entirety of Kingswinford and its suburban village of Wall Heath, as well as nearby rural areas such as Hinksford and Ashwood.

Closest cities, towns and villages

Places of interest

Glass Museum

Broadfield House Glass Museum, on Compton Drive, was housed in a Grade II listed building set in its own grounds, and formed part of the historic Stourbridge Glass Quarter. It had a notable collection of British glass, much of it made locally, from historic 18th century pieces to contemporary works from Britain's leading glass artists. Plans to retain the collection at Broadfield House were shattered and the museum eventually closed in September 2015, to make way for a new glass museum in nearby Wordsley.

Holbeche House
Near Kingswinford is Holbeche House, a small country house which has now been turned into a nursing home. It was here in 1605 that most of the men who had attempted to blow up Parliament with Guy Fawkes were cornered, and a bloody gunfight ensued, resulting in the deaths of at least four of the conspirators, including their leader Robert Catesby. Bullet holes can still be seen in the house's walls, but it is not open to the public.
Many of the streets of the Charterfields housing development, built during the 1970s, adopted the names of the Gunpowder Plot conspirators, such as Catesby Drive (Robert Catesby), Digby Road (Sir Everard Digby), Keyes Drive (Robert Keyes), Tresham Road (Francis Tresham), Ambrose Crescent (Ambrose Rokewood), Monteagle Drive (Lord Monteagle – William Parker) and Rokewood Close (Ambrose Rokewood).

The Cross Inn 
Located in the heart of Kingswinford on the corner of Moss Grove and the High Street lies The Cross Inn. For over 200 years the inn has been proudly showing off its historic architecture, and was listed Grade II in the 1970s. First recorded in the 1750 parish map, it was owned in the early 19th century by Diana Briscoe of Summerhill House and the inn has been mentioned throughout time in local newspapers. The pub was brought from a previous owner by Weatherspoons who refurbished it at a cost of £2.57 million in 2019 and continue to run it at present accommodating most of the little night life around the area.

Townsend
There is an area at the end of Kingswinford which has been known as Townsend dating back to 19th century maps of the area. It was centred on Townsend House, the family seat of the Badley family from the 17th until the early 20th century. The Georgian house was demolished in the 1950s to build a shopping precinct. John Badley of Townsend (1678–1768) was an ancestor of John Badley, F.R.C.S. and John Haden Badley the centenarian educator and founder of Bedales School.

Local churches
The parish church of St. Mary  dates back to the 11th century, although much of the main body of the building is from the 17th century. It contains a notable Norman carving of St. Michael slaying the dragon. The church is also home to a well-regarded two manual Nicholson and Lord pipe organ. It remained the church of the huge parish of Kingswinford until it was closed because of mining activities in 1831, when a new parish church was built, Holy Trinity Church in Wordsley. It reopened in 1846, initially as a chapel of ease, before regaining parochial status (with a smaller parish). It is the parish church for the Kingswinford Team of Anglican churches. The building is now a Grade II listed building. The churchyard contains Commonwealth war graves of four service personnel of World War I and six of World War II.

In addition to the parish church, Kingswinford is also home to several churches of other denominations, including:
Our Lady of Lourdes R.C. Church
Arise Church UK
Crestwood Church
Kingswinford Methodist Church
Kingswinford Christian Fellowship

Transport
Kingswinford is well served by buses that connect it to Dudley, Stourbridge, Wolverhampton, Merry Hill and Brierley Hill. There has never been an official rail connection in Kingswinford, but there were halts on the now-disused Wombourne Branch Line. The nearest stations were the Gornal Halt, Himley, and Pensnett Halt. It was linked by rail to Oxley, and the colliery at Baggeridge.

The halts and stations closed to passengers in 1932, and the entire line from Wolverhampton to Kingswinford was closed to freight traffic in the 1960s, although the stub near Pensnett Halt served the nearby Pensnett Trading Estate until 1994, when the entire stub to Kingswinford Junction was closed. Portions of the track remain in situ, however, as well as the platforms as far as Pensnett Halt. Gornal Halt has since been replaced by residential development, and Himley station now forms part of the South Staffordshire Railway Walk.

Today, the nearest active railway stations are in Wolverhampton and Stourbridge. When the West Midlands Metro extension from Wednesbury to Brierley Hill is completed, its nearest stops to Kingswinford will be Brierley Hill and Merry Hill.

In 2019, PMOL announced plans to reopen the South Staffordshire Line from Stourbridge to Merry Hill with the possibility of reopening the Wombourne Branch Line to Pensnett, a mile away. Plans had previously been forestalled by the discovery of an ancient ant colony in the area designated for development.

Education

Primary schools
Kingswinford serves 5–11 year olds with eight primary schools, one of which is a special school.

 Blanford Mere Primary School
 Bromley Hills Primary School
 Crestwood Park Primary School
 Dawley Brook Primary School
 Dingle Community Primary School
 Glynne Primary School
 St Mary's Church of England (VC) Primary School
 The Brier School (Special School) 

Bromley Hills, The Brier School and secondary school, The Crestwood School, sit together on a site located on Bromley Lane, Kingswinford. They are part of a project that involves a standard Primary School and a Special Educational Needs (SEN) school, and a secondary school, which work closely with each other. The area known as Campus 21 has benefitted from investment including the building of The Brier School (SEN 5–19) and a new sports hall.

Secondary schools
The area has three major secondary schools:
Kingswinford Academy is located a five-minute walk from the main road that runs through Kingswinford, the A491 (Market Street).
Summerhill School is located some half-mile away and has recently undergone major building works. Perhaps reflecting the area's emotion, it was rebuilt in 2003 with a brand new 21st century design replacing the original 1950s buildings. This project was one of the first large scale PFI projects (the deal was worth around £27 million) and is considered to be a showcase for the local authority's education provision. A remaining building from the old school that was built in 1993 was the subject of local debate since its closure in 2003, with Dudley Metropolitan Borough council intent upon using it to house the borough's archives. This caused conflict following the proposal of an alternative scheme (The C.I.C Kingswinford) put forward by a local young entrepreneur (John Hackett) to use the building as an arts centre that was rejected by the council. The council planned to move the archives service to this building in 2007, but the scheme was cancelled in 2008 after it was found to be uneconomical. The building was damaged, but not destroyed, in an arson attack on 5 November 2008, carried out by 2 current students at the time. It sat derelict for a while before being finally demolished.
The Crestwood School is located on another hectic road through Kingswinford that joins the A491 (Market Street) to the Brierley Hill area, often used, to residents' dismay, as a fast way to Merry Hill Shopping Centre. The Crestwood School has recently also undergone major building works, which has seen the moving of the Brier school upon land between Crestwood (As known to locals) and Bromley Hills Primary School. This has also been seen as an inconvenience to local residents as it has brought extra traffic to an already busy road, especially at school run times.

Notable people
Edward Sutton, 5th Baron Dudley, owned the manor of Kingswinford and was largely responsible for developing the mining industry in the area.

George Saxby Penfold was Rector of Kingswinford from December 1831 until his death in 1846, but held other livings as well.

William Robertson Coe, insurance, railroad and business executive, emigrated to the US.

Frederick Augustus Coe, Iron works manager

Members of Parliament for the former Kingswinford constituency

Questions asked in Parliament by Kingswinford MPs
 Mr Alexander Hill 24 November 1885 – 1 October 1900
 Mr William Webb 1 October 1900 – 14 June 1905
 Mr Charles Sitch 14 December 1918 – 27 October 1931
 Mr Alan Todd 27 October 1931 – 14 November 1935
 Mr Arthur Henderson 14 November 1935 – 23 February 1950

References

External links
Kingswinford Information Site
BBC Investigation into Captain Lazonby-Threpwell
Dudley Borough Council
BBC News Crocodile Report
Ralphs Surf Shack – The Alternative Guide to Kingswinford
The Pig King of Kingswinford
Your Dudley
Two-Headed Pheasant Mystery
Wordsley Team Parish
Calvary Church, Kingswinford

Areas of Dudley